Isaac Baker Woodbury (October 23, 1819 1858) was a 19th-century composer and publisher of church music, most famous for publishing The Dulcimer: or the New York Collection of Sacred Music, one of the best-known collection of Christian hymns of the era. Born in Beverly, Massachusetts, his best-known hymn tunes include Siloam and Esmonton. He also published the American Monthly Musical Review.

References

Sources

External links
 

American male composers
1819 births
1858 deaths
People from Beverly, Massachusetts
19th-century American composers
19th-century American male musicians
Musicians from Massachusetts